Saint-Donat Aerodrome  is located at Saint-Donat, Quebec, Canada.

It is the only aerodrome in the area, the next nearest are located to the south at Joliette and north at Mont-Laurier Airport and La Macaza. 

The runway is 3000 ft long by 30 ft wide, oriented in headings 12 and 30.  Many services are available on the ground, no refueling, maintenance and tie down.  Touch-and-go landings are not allowed. The maintenance is 12 months.

References

External links
 Airport of Saint-Donat
 http://www.navcanada.ca/EN/products-and-services/Documents/eCFS6_15-August-2019.pdf

Registered aerodromes in Lanaudière